In color printing, print registration is the layering of printed patterns to form a multicolor pattern. Registration error is the "position misalignment in the overlapped patterns." Machine components such as the print cylinder, doctor blade assembly, printing plates, stress/friction and more, affect the registration of the machine.  Inconsistencies among these components can cause the printing press to fall out of registration; that is when press operators will begin to see defects in their print. There are many different ways to achieve proper registration, many of which employ the alignment of registration marks (pictured right). Many press manufacturers have installed automatic register systems to assist the operator in getting the print back into proper alignment.

Purpose
When printing an image or a package of some sort that has more than one color, it is necessary to print each color separately and ensure each color overlaps the others precisely. If this is not done, the finished image will look fuzzy, blurred or "out of register" (see image to right). If one or more print units, plate or other print component is out of registration, the result can be printed colors in the wrong areas, overprint or white space. With proper registration, there will be no white space, out of margin colors, or confusing overlap of images in the print. To help line the colors up correctly, a registration system is necessary.

Remedies

Trapping
A remedy for slight misregistration is trapping. Trapping is a method of adjusting areas where two distinct, adjacent colors meet so that press misregistration won't cause white spaces. Where two colours abut, the lighter colour is slightly expanded into the darker to create an overlap. This yields a darker outline, which is considered less objectionable than a white gap. A major exception to this is the case when opaque (colors that completely obscure colors printed beneath them) spot colors are used. Other colors, regardless of their relative luminance, are always trapped to (spread under) these spot colors. If several of these spot colors are used (a common practice in the packaging market), the order of printing layers rather than luminance is the decisive element: the first color to be printed is spread under the next color. The trap width is dictated by the maximum amount of misregistration of the entire workflow up to the press.

Overprinting
Black ink is set to "overprint" colors in the background. The difference is not visible since the lighter color is spread underneath the—almost—opaque black.

Types of (stone) lithography registration

There are many different styles of registration for many different types of printing. These deal with stone lithography, as used in fine arts printmaking.

T-bar
This method, using small measured registration marks on both the stone and the paper, is very accurate and simple to do.  The printer measures the exact size of the paper and the desired margins.  Then marks are made at both ends of the sheet of paper, and corresponding marks (usually in the shape of a "T") are made on the stone.  Then the printer matches the marks on the paper to those on the stone.  This way many runs of different colors can be pulled exactly in line with one another, each of them measured from the same system of marks.

Pin-hole

This method involves laying the paper on the un-inked surface, and making a pin-hole through both the bottom and top of the paper, being careful to make a mark in the stone's surface.  Then the locations of the holes are transferred to each sheet of paper to be printed.  When printing, one should place pins in each hole of a sheet of paper, and lower it onto the inked stone, placing each pin in its respective hole in the stone. This method can ruin paper by creating holes.  And if the holes get too large, they lose their function as registration devices.

Eyeballing

This method relies solely on hand–eye coordination. Eyeballing can be found in other industries as well.  The printer places the paper over the stone-image, measuring and judging registration by eye.  This is not very consistent, depending on the person.

References

Publishing
Printing terminology
Print production
Quality issues in printing